Grandview Township is one of fifteen townships in Edgar County, Illinois, USA.  As of the 2010 census, its population was 590 and it contained 260 housing units.

Geography

Unincorporated towns
 Conlogue
 Dudley
 Grandview

Cemeteries
The township contains these twelve cemeteries: Augustus, Barr-Johnson, Beatty, Boyer, Cholera, Gill, Grandview, Hinds, Huffman, New Goshen, Rudy and Tate. There is also Baber Family Cemetery, Goshen, Ryan.

Major highways
  Illinois Route 16

Airports and landing strips
 Bussart Airport
 Glatthaar Airport
 Gough Airport

Demographics

School districts
 Kansas Community Unit School District 3
 Paris Community Unit School District 4

Political districts
 Illinois' 15th congressional district
 State House District 110
 State Senate District 55

References
 
 United States Census Bureau 2007 TIGER/Line Shapefiles
 United States National Atlas

External links
 City-Data.com
 Illinois State Archives
 Edgar County Official Site

Townships in Edgar County, Illinois
Townships in Illinois